Emile Jansen (born 21 November 1959, in Apeldoorn) is a Dutch television, film and theatre actor.

Career
After studying at the Apeldoorn Grammar School, he was at the Arnhem School for Dramatic Arts.

He then appeared in several Dutch and German TV series including Zeg 'ns Aaa, Grijpstra en de Gier, Juliana, ONM, Flikken Maastricht, Samen and Ernst, Bobbie en de rest. In Germany, he appeared in Hausmeister Krause.
In 2008, he returned to GTST, the best known Dutch soap opera, as detective Huibert Rem. In February 2009 he was then in the online soap-series Deadline, launched by the ladies glossy Libelle. He was a divorced and frustrated ex-husband Gerard. In March 2009 he played the theatre in U bent Onze Moeder, joining Alexander van Heteren. In the UK feature film Other Side of the Game, premiering in 2009 in London, he played drug criminal Frank Houwer.
In 2009, he played Dr. David Herschel in the short film Rapture.

In theatre, he has played parts in Of Mice and Men, Seduced, Achteraf, as well as in plays by Michael Punter and Peter Barlach.

Awards
In September 2008, Janses received the Entertainment Award at the Canary Wharf Film Festival in London for his lead role as a CEO in the mobile phones comedy series Shop Spank.

Filmography
 1981: Te Gek Om Los te Lopen (Nicht im Abspann genannt)
 1989: Gwang tin lung fu wui (International: China White)
 1996: Advocaat van de Hanen
 2006: Zwartboek (International: Black Book / Nicht im Abspann genannt)
 2007: Contained
 2007: Ik ook
 2007: Fatum
 2007: Buuv
 2008: Oorlogswinter (International: Winter in Wartime)
 2009: Jack Said (USA, DVD-Titel: Paul Tanter's Jack Said)
 2011: Levenslang

References

External links
 Emile Jansen official website
 
 Canary Wharf Awards Night

1959 births
Living people
Dutch male actors
People from Apeldoorn